Mattityahu is a Hebrew first name literally meaning "The gift of Yahweh".  English renderings include Matthew, Matthias, and Mattathias. Mattithyahu is a variation.

Mattityahu may refer to:

People
Mattathias (died 165 BCE), Jewish priest also known as Mattityahu
Mattityahu Peled (1923–1995), Israeli public figure
Mattityahu Strashun (1817–1885), rabbi and scholar
Matisyahu (born 1979), reggae musician
Matisyahu Salomon, rabbi and public speaker

Other uses
Matityahu, Mateh Binyamin, an Israeli settlement in the West Bank